, nicknamed "U-ta", is a Japanese musician. Known as the bassist of the rock band Buck-Tick since 1983. He is the younger brother of Toll Yagami, Buck-Tick's drummer.

History 
In 1985, when Higuchi and Hidehiko Hoshino graduated high school they moved to Tokyo together, where Higuchi started business school.  Throughout Buck-Tick's long career, his only writing credit has been lyrics for "Under the Moon Light" (b-side of the "Aku no Hana" single).

Higuchi has also performed on Fake?'s Marilyn is a Bubble, Shammon's Lorelei, and on Tribute to The Star Club featuring Hikage.

Wild Wise Apes 
Wild Wise Apes is a side project that he began in 2004. It consists of himself as bassist and Atsushi Okuno as vocalist. They released their first album, 3rd World, on July 14, 2004.

References

External links 
 

Buck-Tick members
Visual kei musicians
Japanese rock bass guitarists
People from Takasaki, Gunma
1967 births
Living people
Musicians from Gunma Prefecture